The Pacific Ocean evolved in the Mesozoic from the Panthalassic Ocean, which had formed when Rodinia rifted apart around 750 Ma. The first ocean floor which is part of the current Pacific Plate began 160 Ma to the west of the central Pacific and subsequently developed into the largest oceanic plate on Earth.

The East Pacific Rise near Easter Island is the fastest spreading mid-ocean ridge, with a spreading rate of over 15 cm/yr. The Pacific Plate moves generally towards the northwest at between 7 and 11 cm/yr while the Juan De Fuca Plate has an east-northeasterly movement of some 4 cm/yr.

Most subduction zones around the rim of the Pacific are directed away from a large area in the southern Pacific.  At the core–mantle boundary below this area there is a large low-shear velocity province (LLSVP).  Most of Pacific hotspots are located above the LLSVP while the longest Pacific hotspot tracks are located at or near its boundaries pointing at the positions of large igneous provinces.

Charles Darwin proposed a theory that explained the existence of reefs by means of slow subsidence of the ocean floor. His theories have been verified and expanded in the development of plate tectonics.

History

In the Early Jurassic, the supercontinent Pangaea was surrounded by the superocean Panthalassa, the ocean floor of which was composed of the Izanagi, Farallon and, Phoenix plates.
These three plates were joined at a migrating, or unstable, ridge-ridge-ridge (RRR) triple junction from which the Pacific Plate began to grow 190 million years ago in an area east of the Mariana Trench; this area, known as the Pacific Triangle, is the oldest part of the Pacific Plate and therefore the oldest ocean floor of the Pacific.  Spreading laterally from this triangle are the Hawaiian, Japanese, and Phoenix magnetic lineations, the earliest traces of how the Pacific Plate began to grow as a RRR triple junction fell apart into three triple junctions.  Virtually all of the three Panthalassic plates have now been subducted beneath surrounding continents but their spreading rates have been preserved in the magnetic lineations around the Pacific Triangle.

In the North Pacific, magnetic anomalies south of the Aleutian Islands, indicate the presence of a now almost completely subducted tectonic plate, known as the Kula Plate, which probably existed from the Late Cretaceous to the Eocene ( 83–40 Ma).  This plate probably broke off the Farallon Plate, and when subduction in the North Pacific shifted from Siberia to the Aleutian Trench c. 50 Ma, spreading ceased between the Kula plate and the Pacific Plate.

The Pacific Plate kept growing and lineations south of the Pacific Triangle indicate the Pacific-Phoenix ridge remained a simple N–S trending spreading system 156–120 Ma.  Following the formation and break-up of the Ontong Java-Hikurangi-Manihiki large igneous province 120 Ma, however, the Phoenix Plate broke into several smaller tectonic plates.  The complexity of the Mid-Pacific and Magellan lineations indicate the presence of a series of microplates around the Pacific-Phoenix-Farallon triple junction.

The Farallon Plate subducted under North America from the late Mesozoic, while spreading between the Pacific and Farallon plates was initiated 190 Ma and lasted until the break-up of the Farallon Plate 23 Ma.  During the Cenozoic the Farallon Plate broke-up along the eastern Pacific margin into the Kula, Vancouver/Juan de Fuca, and Cocos plates.

Geological origins of the Pacific islands
The islands of the Pacific have developed in a number of ways. Some have originated as chains of volcanic islands on the tectonic plates either as a result of mantle plumes or by fracture propagation. Atolls have developed in tropical waters when, after volcanoes sink, coral growth results in reefs as evidenced by the Cook Islands. Coral reefs can develop into islands over a submerged extinct volcano following uplift as in Makatea and Rennell Island in the Solomon Archipelago which have steep coral cliffs over 100 metres high.

The Pacific Plate emigrates northeast towards extensive subduction trenches.  South of Japan, the Izu-Bonin and Mariana island arcs (IBM) formed in front of a clockwise rotating Philippine Sea Plate.  The IBM trenches began to grow in length  , opening back-arc basins in the Philippine Sea.  Between 30 and 17 Mya, the old age of the subducting Pacific Ocean floor (110-130 Ma) resulted in a very fast trench migration and new back-arc basins opening behind the trenches.

The ocean floor of the Pacific Ocean is composed of nine oceanic tectonic plates, all located in the southeast where the East Pacific Rise separates the Pacific Plate from the Antarctic, Juan Fernández, Nasca, Easter, Galápagos, Cocos, Rivera, Juan de Fuca plates.
In the western and southwestern Pacific continental blocks and back-arc basins form one of the most complex regions on earth stretching from Japan to New Zealand.

Plate movements have also caused fragments of continental crust to be rotated away from landmasses so as to form islands. Zealandia which broke off from Gondwana 70 million years ago with the spreading of the Tasman Sea, has since resulted in island protrusions such as New Zealand and New Caledonia. Related causes of island formation include obduction and subduction at convergent plate boundaries. Malaita and Ulawa in the Solomon Islands are the result of obduction while the effects of subduction can be seen in the formation of volcanic island arcs such as the Aleutian Arc off Alaska and the Kermadec-Tonga Subduction Zone north of New Zealand.

Andesite line

Along the rim of the Pacific Basin are convergent plate boundaries often referred to as the andesite line since orogenic andesite is associated with this boundary.  This line is often, but erroneously, confused with the boundaries of either the Pacific Plate or the Pacific basin; the andesite line, however, also includes the Juan de Fuca, Cocos, and Nazca plates on its eastern boundary.
This petrologic boundary separates the deeper mafic igneous rock of the Central Pacific Basin from the partially submerged continental areas of felsic igneous rock on its margins.
Outside of the andesite line, volcanism is explosive; the Pacific Ring of Fire is the world's foremost belt of explosive volcanism. The Ring of Fire is named after the several hundred active volcanoes that sit above the various subduction zones.

Earthquakes
In March and April 2008, a series or swarm of moderate earthquakes occurred both near and within the Blanco Fracture Zone. The swarm began on 30 March when over 600 measurable tremors began occurring north of the zone within the Juan de Fuca Plate. A decade earlier, in January 1998, another swarm was detected at Axial Seamount in the Juan de Fuca Ridge. At the time of its occurrence, scientists were not aware that the series of faults in this plate even existed. In a remote region of the central Pacific Ocean, at the southeastern section of the Gilbert Islands, a major swarm of intraplate earthquakes occurred between December 1981 and March 1983, with no prior seismicity having been reported in this region previously. Another swarm was detected on the Queen Charlotte Islands fracture zone in August–September 1967.

Features

Guyots and seamounts

Alexa Bank
Allison Guyot
Cape Johnson Guyot
Capricorn Seamount
Crough Seamount
Daiichi-Kashima Seamount
Darwin Guyot
Erimo Seamount
Geologists Seamounts
Horizon Guyot
Marshall Islands
MIT Guyot
Rano Rahi seamounts
Resolution Guyot
Takuyo-Daini
Takuyo-Daisan

Seamount chains and hotspots
The Pacific Ocean contains several long seamount chains, formed by hotspot volcanism. These include the Hawaiian–Emperor seamount chain, the Tasmantid Seamount Chain, the Lord Howe Seamount Chain and the Louisville Ridge.

Arago hotspot
Bowie hotspot
Cobb hotspot
Easter hotspot
Galápagos hotspot
Hawaii hotspot
Juan Fernández hotspot
Lamont seamount chain
Louisville hotspot
Macdonald hotspot
Marquesas hotspot
Ngatemato seamounts
Pitcairn hotspot
Rarotonga hotspot
Samoa hotspot
Tarava Seamounts
Tasmantid hotspot
Taukina seamounts
Ujlān volcanic complex

Arcs and belts

Aleutian Arc
Andesite line
Halmahera Arc
Philippine Mobile Belt
Philippine-Halmahera Arc

Faults and fracture zones

Blanco Fracture Zone
Eltanin Fault System
Macquarie Fault Zone
Molucca Sea Collision Zone
Queen Charlotte Fault
Sorong Fault

Underwater ridges and plateaus

Carnegie Ridge
Chile Rise
Darwin Rise
East Pacific Rise
East Tasman Plateau
Explorer Ridge
Galapagos Rise
Gorda Ridge
Hollister Ridge
Juan de Fuca Ridge
Juan Fernández Ridge
Kula-Farallon Ridge
Lord Howe Rise
Magellan Rise
Mid-Pacific Mountains
Nazca Ridge
Norfolk Ridge
Pacific-Antarctic Ridge
Pacific-Farallon Ridge
Pacific-Kula Ridge
Phoenix Ridge
Shatsky Rise
Tehuantepec Ridge

Trenches and troughs

Challenger Deep
HMRG Deep
Kilinailai Trench
Manus Trench
Mariana Trough
Nankai Trough

Plates

Amurian Plate
Antarctic Plate
Balmoral Reef Plate
Banda Sea Plate
Bird's Head Plate
Caroline Plate
Cocos Plate
Conway Reef Plate
Easter Plate
Eurasian Plate
Futuna Plate
Galapagos Microplate
Gorda Plate
Halmahera Plate
Indo-Australian Plate
Juan de Fuca Plate
Juan Fernández Plate
Kermadec Plate
Kula Plate
Manus Plate
Maoke Plate
Mariana Plate
Molucca Sea Plate
Nazca Plate
New Hebrides Plate
Niuafo'ou Plate
North American Plate
North Bismarck Plate
North Galapagos Microplate
Okhotsk Plate
Okinawa Plate
Pacific Plate
Philippine Sea Plate
Rivera Plate
Sangihe Plate
Solomon Sea Plate
South Bismarck Plate
Sunda Plate
Timor Plate
Tonga Plate
Woodlark Plate
Yangtze Plate

Volcanoes

Alcedo Volcano
Alofi Island
Ball's Pyramid
Bartolomé Island
Clarion Island
Daphne Major
Eastern Gemini Seamount
Futuna (Wallis and Futuna)
Galápagos Islands
Genovesa Island
Hallasan
Isabela Island (Galápagos)
Isla Salas y Gómez
Kilauea
Lord Howe Island
Maquinna
Marchena Island
Matthew and Hunter Islands
Mauna Loa
Mount Lidgbird
Norfolk Island
Nunivak Island
Phillip Island (Norfolk Island)
Pinta Island
Poike
Rábida Island
Revillagigedo Islands
Rocas Alijos
San Benedicto Island
Santiago Island (Galápagos)
Sierra Negra (Galápagos)
Socorro Island
South Arch volcanic field
Tamu Massif
Volcán Wolf

References

Notes

Sources